Ouenzé is one of the arrondissements of Brazzaville, capital of Republic of Congo. It is located in the north of the capital. Brazzaville is divided into seven arrondissements, or districts: Makélékélé (1), Bacongo (2), Poto-Poto (3), Moungali (4), Ouenzé (5), Talangaï (6) and Mfilou (7).

There are many sports like judo, karate etc. Most of them are called "Pomba" especially in an area called Texaco-city is the famous place. But the main common sport is football because it had five of the best clubs in Brazzaville: "Saint Michel de Ouenzé"; "AS Police (Brazzaville)"; "Ajax de Ouenzé" ;"CARA Brazzaville" and "As Mbako".

Population
The population is about 1000 residents.

Education 
Most of residents are educated. They use as spoken languages French, Lingala and Kituba.

References

External links 
 http://r-congo.cg/ouenze

Geography of Brazzaville